Aarhus Festuge (Aarhus Festival) is a 10-day arts and culture festival in the city of Aarhus, Denmark. It takes place every year in late August to early September (in weeks 35-36).

The first Aarhus Festival happened in 1965, after being established the year before as an experiment to bring together and activate the city’s institutions and associations. The overarching purpose was to present Aarhus’ cultural profile, based on the political idea that art, culture and community are essential for a flourishing city. It was considered a great success, and the festival has since become an annual tradition.

Since 1965, Aarhus Festuge has evolved into being more than just a local event. Nowadays, it has a more international focus, and over the years, artists from all across the world has been a part of the festivities.

Description 
With local and international artists, and events for both children, young people, and adults, Aarhus Festival has grown to encompass around 1000 events in 10 days. That makes it one of the largest cultural events in Northern Europe. The happenings spans a broad range of cultural genres, such as music, theatre, architecture, food, art installations, talks, and dancing, as well as general entertainment.

About one third of the events are planned and arranged by the Festival's head office, while the remaining two thirds are organised by private or external actors in the city. Thereby, Aarhus Festival creates a platform for creativity, development and cooperation between the city’s cultural actors, businesses, restaurants, venues, and associations.

History 
Aarhus Festuge was established in 1964, debuted in September 1965 and has since then become one of the largest themed festivals in Northern Europe.

In 2014, Aarhus Festival took place from 29 August to 7 September. It was the festivals' 50th anniversary, and was marked with the theme ‘Same but different’.

Themes 

Aarhus Festival always has a theme, which is chosen for three-year periods. The theme is a guideline and an inspiration for the events, and is visible in many aspects of the Festival. The annual poster, which is created by a different artist each year, is the visual representation of the theme. For 2020-2022, the theme is ‘In It Together’

Gallery

Nearby cities 
Similar cultural festivals are simultaneously held in some nearby cities. Randers Ugen has been celebrated in Randers since 1976 and Trekantsområdets Festuge since 2014 in the cities of Vejle, Fredericia and Kolding and surrounding smaller towns, collectively known as the Triangle Region.

References

External links 

Events in Aarhus
1965 establishments in Denmark
Festivals established in 1965
Arts festivals in Denmark